The Dallas–Fort Worth Film Critics Association Award for Worst Film (Picture) is an award that was given by the Dallas–Fort Worth Film Critics Association from 1991 to 2008 to "honor" the worst achievements in film-making.

Winners
 † = Golden Raspberry Award for Worst Picture

1990s

2000s

References

Worst Film